Farlowella venezuelensis is a species of armored catfish endemic to Venezuela where it is found in the Guarapiche River basin and the lower Orinoco River basin.  This species grows to a length of  SL.

References 
 

venezuelensis
Fish of Venezuela
Endemic fauna of Venezuela
Fish described in 1964